Kenneth Noland (April 10, 1924 – January 5, 2010) was an American painter. He was one of the best-known American color field painters, although in the 1950s he was thought of as an abstract expressionist and in the early 1960s he was thought of as a minimalist painter. Noland helped establish the Washington Color School movement. In 1977, he was honored by a major retrospective at the Solomon R. Guggenheim Museum in New York that then traveled to the Hirshhorn Museum and Sculpture Garden in Washington, D.C. and Ohio's Toledo Museum of Art in 1978. In 2006, Noland's Stripe Paintings were exhibited at the Tate in London.

Early life and education
A son of Harry Caswell Noland (1896–1975), a pathologist, and his wife, Bessie (1897–1980), Kenneth Clifton Noland was born in Asheville, North Carolina. He had four siblings: David, Bill, Neil, and Harry Jr.

Noland enlisted in the U.S. Air Force in 1942 after completing high school. As a veteran of World War II, Noland took advantage of the G.I. Bill to study art at the experimental Black Mountain College in his home state of North Carolina. At Black Mountain, where two of his brothers also studied art, Noland studied with Ilya Bolotowsky, a professor who introduced him to neoplasticism and the work of Piet Mondrian. Noland also studied Bauhaus theory and color there under Josef Albers and became interested in Paul Klee—specifically Klee's sensitivity to color.

Career

In 1948 and 1949 Noland worked with Ossip Zadkine in Paris, and had his first exhibition of his paintings there in 1949. After returning to the U.S., he taught in Washington, D.C. at Catholic University (1951–1960) and the Institute of Contemporary Arts. In the early 1950s he met Morris Louis in D.C. while teaching night classes at the Washington Workshop Center for the Arts. He became friends with Louis, and after being introduced by Clement Greenberg to Helen Frankenthaler and seeing her new paintings at her studio in New York City in 1953, he and Louis adopted her "soak-stain" technique of allowing thinned paint to soak into unprimed canvases.

Most of Noland's paintings fall into one of four groups: circles (or targets), chevrons, stripes and shaped canvases. His preoccupation with the relationship of the image to the containing edge of the picture led him to a series of studies of concentric rings or bullseyes, commonly referred to as targets, which, like the one reproduced here called Beginning from 1958, used unlikely color combinations. This also led Noland away from Morris Louis in 1958. In 1964, he was included in the exhibition Post-Painterly Abstraction curated by Clement Greenberg, which traveled the country and helped to firmly establish color field painting as an important new movement in the contemporary art of the 1960s. Noland pioneered the shaped canvas, initially with a series of symmetrical and asymmetrical diamonds or chevrons. In these paintings, the edges of the canvas become as structurally important as the center. During the 1970s and 1980s his shaped canvases were highly irregular and asymmetrical. These resulted in increasingly complex structures of highly sophisticated and controlled color and surface integrity.

Instead of painting the canvas with a brush, Noland's style was to stain the canvas with color. This idea sought to remove the artist through brushstrokes. This made the piece about the art, not the artist. He emphasized spatial relationships in his work by leaving unstained, bare canvas as a contrast against the colors used throughout his paintings. Noland used simplified abstraction so the design would not detract from the use of color.

Noland's students included the sculptor Jennie Lea Knight, and painter Alice Mavrogordato.

Personal life
Noland was married to:

 Cornelia Langer, a daughter of a Republican U.S. senator from North Dakota, William Langer. The couple married in 1950 and later divorced. They had three children: daughters Cady and Lyndon (a.k.a. Lyn) and a son, William.
 Stephanie Gordon, a psychologist, lived with Noland from November 1964 until June 1970. They married in April 1967 and divorced in June 1970.
 Peggy L. Schiffer, an art historian and daughter of Dr. Morton A. Schiffer. Married circa 1970, the Nolands had one son, Samuel Jesse.
 Paige Rense, editor in chief of Architectural Digest, whom he married in Bennington, Vermont on April 10, 1994. Noland was her fourth husband; her previous spouses included Arthur F. Rense.

Noland had an affair in the 1960s with artist and socialite Mary Pinchot Meyer.

Death
Noland died of kidney cancer at his home in Port Clyde, Maine, on January 5, 2010, at the age of 85.

Exhibitions
Noland had his first solo exhibition at Galerie Raymond Creuze in Paris in 1948. In 1957, he had his first New York solo exhibition at the Tibor de Nagy Gallery. In 1964, Noland occupied half the American pavilion at the Venice Biennale. In 1965, his work was exhibited at the Washington Gallery of Modern Art and the Jewish Museum (New York). Noland's final solo exhibition, Kenneth Noland Shaped Paintings 1981–82, opened on October 29, 2009, at the Leslie Feely Fine Art Gallery on East 68th Street in New York City and was scheduled to close on January 9, 2010 (though the closing date was later extended to January 16). In 2010, Noland was honored with a solo presentation of his work at the Guggenheim Museum, entitled Kenneth Noland, 1924–2010: A Tribute. In addition, his work has been the subject of solo exhibitions at a range of international institutions, including the Museo de Arte Moderno, Mexico City (1983); Museo de Bellas Artes de Bilbao, Bilbao, Spain (1985); Museum of Fine Arts, Houston (2004); Tate, Liverpool (2006); and Butler Institute of American Art, Youngstown, Ohio (1986 and 2007).

Influence
In 1984, US menswear designer Alexander Julian incorporated Noland's designs and coloring in his knitwear.

Selected museum collections

Selected works

Notes

References
 Gowing, L (ed.) 1995, A Biographical Dictionary of Artists, Rev. edn, Andromeda Oxford Limited, Oxfordshire.

Further reading
 "Kenneth Noland." Contemporary Artists, 4th ed. St. James Press, 1996. Reproduced in Biography Resource Center. Farmington Hills, Mich.: Thomson Gale. 2005.
 "Kenneth Noland: Color, Format and Abstract Art." Interview by Diane Waldman (1977), in: Theories and Documents of Contemporary Art, edited by K. Stiles and P. Selz, Berkeley: University of California Press, 1996, pp. 94–98.
 "Kenneth Noland." Encyclopedia of World Biography, 2nd ed. 17 Vols. Gale Research, 1998. Reproduced in Biography Resource Center. Farmington Hills, Mich.: Thomson Gale. 2005.
 "Painting: Bold Emblems", an 18 April 1969 profile of Kenneth Noland in Time magazine
 "Art: Pure, Uncluttered Hedonism", a 2 May 1977 review of Kenneth Noland's work by Robert Hughes of Time magazine
 "Painting: Peacock Duo", an 8 May 1965 examination of Kenneth Noland's work

External links

 Kenneth Noland in the National Gallery of Australia's Kenneth Tyler collection 
 Tate08 Series: Kenneth Noland: The Stripe Paintings exhibition at Tate Liverpool, England, 2006
  TheArtStory.com/Kenneth_Noland
   Kenneth Noland at The Phillips Collection
 New York Times artblog by Roberta Smith
 Noland's works at the Solomon R. Guggenheim Museum
 New York Times Obituary
 Washington Post Obituary
 The Guardian Obituary and letter from Anthony Caro
 The Independent Obituary
 

American contemporary painters
20th-century American painters
American male painters
Abstract painters
Minimalist artists
Abstract expressionist artists
Artists from New York (state)
Painters from North Carolina
United States Army Air Forces personnel of World War II
Members of the American Academy of Arts and Letters
Black Mountain College alumni
Artists from Asheville, North Carolina
Military personnel from North Carolina
Deaths from cancer in Maine
Deaths from kidney cancer
1924 births
2010 deaths
20th-century American printmakers
20th-century American male artists